Mojtame-ye Meskuni Siman (also Romanized as Mojtame`-ye Meskūnī Sīmān) is a village in Kuhdasht-e Sharqi Rural District, in the Central District of Miandorud County, Mazandaran Province, Iran. At the 2006 census, its population was 36, in 10 families.

References 

Populated places in Miandorud County